An aryballos (Greek: ἀρύβαλλος; plural aryballoi) was a small spherical or globular flask with a narrow neck used in Ancient Greece. It was used to contain perfume or oil, and is often depicted in vase paintings being used by athletes during bathing. In these depictions, the vessel is at times attached by a strap to the athlete's wrist, or hung by a strap from a peg on the wall.

The shape of the aryballos originally came from the oinochoe of the Geometric period of the 9th century BCE, a globe-shaped wine jar. By the Proto-Corinthian period of the following century, it had attained its definitive shape, going from spherical to ovoid to conical, and finally back to spherical. This definitive form has a wide, flat mouth, and a single small handle. Some later variations have bell-shaped mouths, a second handle, and/or a flat base. Potters also created inventive shapes for aryballoi. The Austrian commission of the Corpus Vasorum Antiquorum is investigating the material properties of these vessels using computed tomography and optical 3D acquisition techniques.

Gallery

See also
 Ancient Greek vase painting
 Pottery of ancient Greece
 Unguentarium

References

External links 

  showing a Computed Tomography scan and rollout of the aryballos No. G26, archaeological collection, Graz University. The video was rendered using the GigaMesh Software Framework, cf. doi:10.11588/heidok.00025189.

Ancient Greek pot shapes